East Retford South is an electoral ward in the district of Bassetlaw. The ward elects two councillors to Bassetlaw District Council using the first past the post electoral system, with each councillor serving a four-year term in office. The number of registered voters in the ward is 3,888 as of 2019.

It consists of the southern part of the village of Ordsall in Retford, south of the train line.

The ward was created in 2002 following a review of electoral boundaries in Bassetlaw by the Boundary Committee for England.

Councillors

The ward elects 2 councillors every four years. Prior to 2015, Bassetlaw District Council was elected by thirds with elections taking place every year except the year in which elections to Nottinghamshire County Council took place.

Elections

2021 by-election
A by-election was held on 29 July 2021 following the resignation of Helen Richards (Labour). Helen subsequently stood for re-election as an Independent candidate.

2019

2015

2014

2012

2010

2008

2006

2004

2002

References

Wards of Nottinghamshire